"Country Boy" is a song by American country musician and Staind lead vocalist Aaron Lewis, and is his first foray into country music. Released on December 7, 2010 through Stroudavarious Records, three versions of the song are featured on Town Line, Lewis' debut EP with a live acoustic version of the song on the iTunes Store deluxe edition of The Road, his debut studio album.

In popular culture 

"Country Boy" is the walkout song for UFC featherweight contender Chad Mendes. Lewis performed the song live at UFC 189 in Las Vegas.

Charts

Certifications

Awards

References 

2011 singles
Aaron Lewis songs
George Jones songs
Chris Young (musician) songs
Charlie Daniels songs
R&J Records singles
Songs written by Aaron Lewis
Song recordings produced by James Stroud
2010 songs